Frank S. Bergin (July 5, 1886 – November 11, 1971) was an American football player, coach, and official.  He played college football as a quarterback at Princeton University from 1907 to 1909.  Bergin was the head football coach at Bowdoin College from 1910 to 1912 and Middlebury College in 1913, compiling a career college football coaching record of 12–14–3.  He refereed college football games for several years after World War I.  Bergin was served in the Connecticut Senate, representing the 10th district in New Haven, and was the chairman of Connecticut Liquor Control Commission.  He died on November 11, 1971, at the age of 85.

Bergin was born on July 5, 1886, in New Haven, Connecticut.  He graduated from Phillips Exeter Academy in 1906, Princeton in 1910, and Columbia Law School in 1913.

Head coaching record

References

1886 births
1971 deaths
20th-century American lawyers
20th-century American politicians
American football quarterbacks
College football officials
Democratic Party Connecticut state senators
Bowdoin Polar Bears football coaches
Middlebury Panthers football coaches
Princeton Tigers football players
Columbia Law School alumni
Phillips Exeter Academy alumni
Lawyers from New Haven, Connecticut
Politicians from New Haven, Connecticut
United States Attorneys for the District of Connecticut